AMLCFT or AML-CFT may refer to:

Most common meaning
 Anti Money Laundering and Counter-Financing of Terrorism
 Anti Money Laundering and Combating the Financing of Terrorism

AMLCFT state offices, regulations
 Anti-money laundering office of the Philippines
 Anti-Money Laundering Office (Thailand)
 AMLCFT regulation in the United States
 US Anti-money laundering program (Patriot Act, Title III, Subtitle B Sec.352)
 Russian Federal Financial Monitoring Service ("Rosfinmonitoring")
 Australian Transaction Reports and Analysis Centre or AUSTRAC, Australian government agency, Australia's anti-money laundering and counter-terrorism financing regulator
 Hong Kong national security law, Hong Kong (SAR)

International institutions, associations, and coordinations

 Asia/Pacific Group on Money Laundering
 Moneyval, the Committee of Experts on the Evaluation of Anti-Money Laundering Measures and the Financing of Terrorism, a monitoring body of the Council of Europe
 Financial Action Task Force on Money Laundering
 Inter-Governmental Action Group against Money Laundering in West Africa
 Association of Certified Anti-Money Laundering Specialists

See also
 AML (disambiguation)
 Anti-money laundering software